Lee Su-hwan (born March 3, 1984) is a South Korean football player who currently plays for Cheonan City FC.

Career statistics 
As of 30 August 2009

References
K League player record 
Korean FA Cup match result 

1984 births
Living people
Association football midfielders
South Korean footballers
Pohang Steelers players
Gimcheon Sangmu FC players
K League 1 players
Korea National League players